Chairman of the Central Military Commission may refer to:
Chairman of the Central Military Commission (China)
Chairman of the Central Military Commission of the Workers' Party of Korea

See also
Secretary of the Central Military Commission of the Communist Party of Vietnam
Chairman of the Military Affairs Commission